Black Welsh people are inhabitants of Wales who have an African or an Afro-Caribbean background and are black. Wales is home to one of the United Kingdom's oldest black communities, and Tiger Bay in Cardiff has housed a large Somali population since the development of the port in the 19th century. The 2011 census reported that there were more than 18,000 Welsh-African people in Wales (0.6% of the Welsh population).

The first recorded black person to live in North Wales, of whom historians have detailed knowledge, was John Ystumllyn (died 1786), a Gwynedd gardener whose origins are unrecorded.

Notable black Welsh people

Sports

Association football
Ethan Ampadu
Nathan Blake
Ben Cabango
Robert Earnshaw
Danny Gabbidon
Ryan Giggs
Adam Henley
Brennan Johnson
Joel Lynch
Rabbi Matondo
Eddie Parris
Jazz Richards
Tyler Roberts
Hal Robson-Kanu
 Sanchez Watt
Sorba Thomas
Ashley Williams

Athletics
Jamie Baulch, sprint athlete
Colin Jackson
Christian Malcolm, track and field athlete
Nigel Walker, former Welsh track and field athlete and Wales international rugby union player

Rugby League
Billy Boston, represented Great Britain
Regan Grace
Clive Sullivan, the first black athlete to captain Great Britain in any sport

Rugby Union

Aled Brew
Nathan Brew
Leon Brown
Mark Brown, became the first known player of black origin to represent Wales in 1983.
Colin Charvis, the first black captain of the Wales national rugby union team
Jason Forster
Ashton Hewitt, Hewitt has also become known for speaking out against racial abuse.
Martyn Madden
Richard Parks, former Wales international rugby union player turned extreme endurance athlete and television presenter
Anthony Sullivan
Ben Thomas
Gavin Thomas
Christ Tshiunza, became the first African born black player to represent Wales in November 2021.
Eli Walker
Nigel Walker
Glen Webbe, often stated to be the first black player to play for Wales, Webbe was the first black player to represent Wales at a World Cup, and is considered by many to be Wales' "first black icon".

Boxing
Steve Robinson

Music
Dame Shirley Bassey, singer
Kizzy Crawford, singer-songwriter and producer
Eädyth, producer and singer-songwriter
Patti Flynn, jazz singer and founder and patron of Black History Wales
Benji Webbe, musician, frontman of the alternative metal band Skindred

Film and television
Josie d'Arby, TV presenter
Rakie Ayola, actress
Rungano Nyoni, film director and screenwriter
Suzanne Packer, actress
Jessica Sula, actress
Tayce, RuPaul's Drag Race UK series 2 contestant
Darragh Mortell, actor

Others

Betty Campbell, headteacher
Abdulrahim Abby Farah, diplomat
Vaughan Gething, Minister for the Economy in the Welsh Government
Uzo Iwobi, equalities practitioner and former Commissioner for the Commission for Racial Equality

References

External links
 

 

African diaspora in Europe